Oral Çalışlar (born 14 December 1946, Tarsus) is a Turkish journalist and writer, currently columnist for Radikal and Serbestiyet, after briefly working as editor-in-chief of Taraf. He was previously a columnist for Cumhuriyet (1992–2008) and Radikal (2008–2013). In the 1960s he participated in the student movement and contributed to Aydınlık. He was imprisoned for three years after the 1971 Turkish coup d'état. He became editor of newly re-established Aydınlık in 1978 and was imprisoned again after the 1980 Turkish coup d'état. As a benefactor of an amnesty, he was eventually released in 1988. From 1990 and 1992 he settled in Hamburg, following an invitation by the cities senate. In 1993 he interviewed two personalities of the Kurdish left-wing politics, Abdullah Öcalan, the founder of the Kurdistan Workers' Party (PKK) and Kemal Burkay the chairman of the Socialist Party of Kurdistan for eighteen days. The publications of the interviews later within a book about the Kurdish question in 1993, led to his conviction for two years for separatist propaganda, a verdict he appealed. After several trials concerning the book, he was sentenced for 13 months imprisonment on grounds that he disseminated separatist propaganda. Also this verdict he also appealed. Both, the Turkish Industry and Business Association (TUSIAD) as well as the Committee to protect Journalists (CPJ) made an opposing statement to Çalışlar  being sentenced. Later he was an activist in defense of the freedom of expression. He is the author of around 20 books.

References 

1946 births
Living people
Turkish journalists
Turkish writers
People from Tarsus, Mersin
Imprisoned journalists
Cumhuriyet people
Radikal (newspaper) people
Taraf people